Ulrich "Ueli" Bächli (born 5 January 1950 in Zürich) is a Swiss bobsledder who competed from the mid-1970s to the early 1980s. Competing in two Winter Olympics, he won two silver medals  in the four-man event (1976, 1980).

Bächli also won four medals at the FIBT World Championships with three silvers (Two-man: 1982; Four-man: 1977, 1978) and one bronze (Four-man: 1979).

References

 Bobsleigh four-man Olympic medalists for 1924, 1932-56, and since 1964
 Bobsleigh two-man world championship medalists since 1931
 Bobsleigh four-man world championship medalists since 1930

Swiss male bobsledders
Bobsledders at the 1976 Winter Olympics
Bobsledders at the 1980 Winter Olympics
Olympic bobsledders of Switzerland
Olympic silver medalists for Switzerland
Olympic medalists in bobsleigh
1950 births
Living people
Medalists at the 1980 Winter Olympics
Medalists at the 1976 Winter Olympics
Sportspeople from Zürich
20th-century Swiss people